Kayode Awosika (born October 27, 1998) is an American football offensive tackle for the Detroit Lions of the National Football League (NFL). He played college football at Buffalo.

Early life 
Kayode Awosika was born on October 27, 1998, in Plymouth, Minnesota, to Nigerian immigrants. He attended Maple Grove Senior High School, being named USA Today first-team All-Minnesota as a senior.

Collegiate career 
Awosika played college football for the University of Buffalo. He redshirted during his freshman year. In his redshirt-freshman year, he saw action in five games, as a reserve offensive tackle. He started all 14 games in his sophomore year and 11 games in his junior year. He was named team captain in his junior year and was named second-team All-MAC. In his senior year, he started seven games, being named first-team All-MAC and a FWAA second-team All-American. He chose to forgo remaining eligibility and instead declare for the NFL Draft.

Professional career

Philadelphia Eagles
After going unselected in the 2021 NFL Draft, Awosika signed as an undrafted free agent with the Philadelphia Eagles. He was given the second-most guaranteed money among the Eagles undrafted free agents, behind Jack Stoll. He was waived on August 31, 2021, and re-signed to the practice squad the next day. Awosika made his NFL debut on January 8, 2022, in the Eagles' week 18 game against the Dallas Cowboys. In doing so, he became the first Maple Grove High School alumnus to play in the NFL. He signed a reserve/future contract with the Eagles on January 18, 2022.

On August 30, 2022, Awosika was waived by the Eagles and signed to the practice squad the next day.

Detroit Lions
On September 15, 2022, Awosika was signed by the Detroit Lions off the Eagles practice squad.

References 

1998 births
Living people
Sportspeople from the Minneapolis–Saint Paul metropolitan area
People from Plymouth, Minnesota
Buffalo Bulls football players
Philadelphia Eagles players
Detroit Lions players
American football offensive tackles
Players of American football from Minnesota